Slow Mass is an American rock band from Chicago, Illinois featuring former members of Into It. Over It., Damiera, and No Sleep Records alum Former Thieves. They took their name from the Glenn Branca composition.

History
Slow Mass began in 2016. That year, they released their first extended play, Treasure Pains, with the record label Landland Colportage. In 2018, Slow Mass released their debut full-length album titled On Watch.

In October 2021 an allegation of  sexual assault was made against Dave Collis on the website 'Not in Our Scene'.

Discography
Studio albums
On Watch (2018)
EPs
Treasure Pains (2016)
Music For Rest (2020)
Singles
Music For Ears 1 (2019)
Music For Ears 2 (2020)
Music For Ears 3 (2020)

References

Musical groups from Chicago